Soulful Strut is a studio album by American saxophonist Grover Washington Jr. The album was released in 1996 on Columbia Records label.

Reception 
Leo Stanley of AllMusic wrote "Soulful Strut is a typically smooth and swinging date from Grover Washington, Jr. Occasionally, the production by Walter Afanasieff is too slick and commercial, diluting the impact of Washington's subtle, relaxed groove. Fortunately, Washington's instrumental skills cut through the gloss, making Soulful Strut another worthy record for mainstream soul-jazz fans".

Track listing

Personnel 
 Grover Washington, Jr.  – soprano saxophone (1, 2, 4, 8, 10), alto saxophone (3, 6, 7, 9), tenor saxophone (5, 10), crowd noises (10)
 Dan Shea – keyboards (1, 2), synth bass (1, 2), synthesizer programming (1, 2), MacIntosh programming (1, 2), drum programming (1, 2), rhythm programming (1, 2), arrangements (1, 2)
 George Whitty – keyboards (3, 4, 6), synthesizers (3, 4, 6), horns (3)
 Jimmy Greco – sampling (3)
 Donald Robinson – acoustic piano (5, 9)
 Charlie Ernst – synthesizers (7)
 Adam Holzman – programming (8)
 Peter Schwartz – programming (8)
 Bob Ward – keyboards (10), programming (10), guitars (10)
 Dann Huff – wah guitar (1), electric guitar (2), acoustic guitar (2)
 Ray Obiedo – guitar (1), guitar solo (1)
 Michael Landau – additional electric guitar (2), additional acoustic guitar (2)
 Chris Taylor – guitar (3, 4, 6), electric guitar (7), acoustic guitar (7)
 Randy Bowland – guitar (5, 9)
 Richard Lee Steacker – guitar (5, 9)
 Steve Bargonetti – guitar (6)
 Paul Pimsler – electric guitar (7), guitars (8)
 Gary Haase – bass (3, 4, 6, 7, 8, 10), drums (3), arrangements and conductor (3, 4, 6, 7, 8, 10), percussion (6), marimba (6), keyboards (7), synth solo (7), programming (8), crowd noises (10)
 Gerald Veasley – bass (5, 9)
 Peter Michael Escovedo – additional drum programming (1), additional rhythm programming (1)
 Steven Wolf – drums (4)
 Richie Morales – drums (5, 9)
 Steve Gadd – drums (6)
 Omar Hakim – drums (7, 8)
 Roger Squitero – congas (3), percussion (4), shaker (10)
 Pablo Batista – congas (5, 9), percussion (5, 7, 9)
 Cyro Baptista – percussion (6)
 Norbert Goldberg – percussion (8)
 Joe Bonadio – congas (10)
 Dale Kelps – alto saxophone (7), alto flute (8, 10), bass clarinet (8, 10)
 Rick Depofi – tenor saxophone (7)
 Aaron Heick – flute (8), saxophone (8)
 Herb Hubel – trombone (7, 8, 10)
 Andy Gravish – trumpet  (7)
 Tim Quimette – trumpet (8)
 Mac Gollehon – trumpet  (10)
 Jim Powell – muted trumpet (10)
 Walter Afanasieff – arrangements (2)
 Billy Mann – arrangements (10), crowd noises (10)
 Sandy Griffith – backing vocals (2)
 Claytoven Richardson – backing vocals (2)
 Jeanie Tracy – backing vocals (2)
 Wayne Hernandez – vocals (3)
 Amanda Homi – vocals (3)
 Rozz Moorehead – vocals (3)
 Lindiwe Dimani – Zulu vocals (6, 8)
 Bakithi Kumalo – Zulu vocals (6, 8)
 Ntomb'khona Dlamini – Zulu vocals (6, 8)
 Catherine Russell – lead and backing vocals (8)
 Wincy Terry – vocals (10)

Production 
 Dan Shea – producer (1, 2), engineer (1, 2)
 Walter Afanasieff – executive producer (1, 2)
 Gary Haase – producer (3, 4, 6, 7, 8, 10)
 Donald Robinson – producer (5, 9)
 Steve Berkowitz – A&R direction 
 Dana Jon Chappelle – engineer (1, 2), mixing (2)
 David Gleeson – engineer (1, 2)
 Rick Bieder – tracking engineer (3, 4, 6, 7, 8, 10)
 Bob Cadway – tracking engineer (3, 4, 6, 7, 8, 10), mixing (4, 6, 8, 10)
 Mark Glass – tracking engineer (3, 6, 7), mixing (7)
 Carl Agstadt – engineer (5, 9)
 Glenn Barratt – engineer (5, 9)
 Ron Shaffer – engineer (5, 9)
 Bob Ward – tracking engineer (7, 10)
 Aman Malik – tracking engineer (8)
 John Genna – tracking assistant (3, 4, 6, 7, 8, 10)
 Doug McGuirk – tracking assistant (3, 4, 7)
 Andy Tarr – tracking assistant (3, 8)
 Juan Bohorquez – tracking assistant (6, 10)
 Terence Dover – tracking assistant (6, 7, 8)
 Dave Scheuer – tracking assistant (6)
 Michael H. Brauer – mixing (1, 3, 5, 9), additional mixing (2)
 Greg Calbi – mastering 
 Paul Silverthorn – project coordinator, management 
 Christine Washington – project coordinator
 Barbara Stout – production coordinator (1, 2)
 Doreen Manzella – production coordinator (3, 4, 6, 7, 8, 10)
 John Pisciotta – production coordinator (3, 4, 6, 7, 8, 10)
 Jacie Berry – production coordinator (5, 9)
 Eileen Whelihan – production coordinator (5, 9)
 Julian Peploe – art direction, design 
 Norman Jean Roy – photography 
 Barry White – grooming 
 Joseph Oppedisiano – styling

Studios
 Recorded at WallyWorld Studios (Marin County, CA); The Dream Factory, WTM Studios and Current Sounds (New York, NY); Morningstar Communications (Spring House, PA).
 Mixed at Sony Music Studios (New York, NY); Cove City Sound Studios (Glen Cove, NY); WallyWorld Studios.
 Edited at WTM Studios
 Mastered at Masterdisk (New York, NY).

Charts

References

1996 albums
Columbia Records albums
Grover Washington Jr. albums